Electo Pereda was a Chilean manager. He coached as a hobby Colo-Colo during 1930s, being militar his original occupation.

References

Chilean Primera División managers
Colo-Colo managers
Chilean football managers